Shankouclava is an extinct genus of tunicate. It represents the oldest, unequivocal genus of tunicates, from 520 million years ago. It has been found in the Lower Cambrian Maotianshan Shale at Shankou village, Anning, near Kunming (South China). Each of the eight specimens found and used for description were isolated, suggesting that the genus was solitary and not colonial. The generic name is composed of the fossil locality, Shankou, and the Latin word clava (club-shaped).

Shankouclava had a soft, sac-like body that was elongated and pointed proximally. The body lengths of individuals vary from 2 cm (0.8 in) to 4 cm (1.6 in).

References

Tunicate genera
Prehistoric chordate genera
Fossil taxa described in 2003
Cambrian genus extinctions